La Ronde is an amusement park in Montreal, Quebec, Canada, built as the entertainment complex for Expo 67, the 1967 World Fair. Today, it is operated by Six Flags under an emphyteutic lease with the City of Montreal, which expires in 2065. It is the largest amusement park in Quebec and second largest in Canada.

It occupies  of Saint Helen's Island's northern tip–a man-made extension to the island in the vicinity of where the small Ronde Island had once been, and the origin of the park's name. The park hosts the annual Montreal Fireworks Festival, an international fireworks competition. La Ronde, and Frontier City in Oklahoma City, are the only two company parks not officially branded as Six Flags parks.

Grounds

The Montreal region park is located within the St Lawrence river on Saint Helen's Island, situated atop a man-made extension on its northern tip where the small (water-enclosed) Ronde Island had once been. The former granite Ronde island, which the extension was made around, was destroyed by blasting and the resulting crater it left turned into Dolphin lake, which the park surrounds.  South of the amusement park is Jean-Drapeau Park, an urban park and former grounds of Expo 67, as well as the Jean-Drapeau Metro station and Montreal Biosphere museum.

Access to the park from Montreal and the South Shore is primarily served by the Jacques Cartier Bridge, or alternatively through Cité du Havre via the Concordia bridge at the island's opposite end. Public transit provides accessibility by means of the island's Metro station with seasonal shuttle bus service to the park.

The amusement park opens to the public from mid-May to late October (with peak season in July). La Ronde closes for the season in the last weekend of October.

History

In 1967, La Ronde was built as the entertainment complex for Expo 67, the world fair held in Montreal from April 27 to October 29, 1967. The rides, restaurants and beer halls of La Ronde remained open until 2:30 a.m. nightly, after the rest of the Expo site closed down at 10:30 p.m. After Expo 67 World's Fair, the City of Montreal continued to run the amusement park for the next 34 years.

In 1972, the rapid transit train system that served La Ronde, the Expo Express, permanently closed in October. Its terminus station sat right above La Ronde's main entrance, and brought off-island visitors directly to the park during Expo 67 and the early days of Man and His World. Although long since demolished, La Ronde's gated entrance is built around the former train station, and an (abandoned) train bridge still sits in the St Lawrence river to the east of the park.

In 1973, on July 8th, the drowning deaths of 2 police officers occurred at La Ronde's Dolphin Lake, after the officers attempted to aid an intoxicated woman who had fallen into the water that night.

In 1979, on July 8th, the drowning deaths of 3 people occurred at La Ronde's Dolphin Lake when "The Mississippi" tour boat, ferrying up to 60 passengers, capsized. Two weeks later, on July 22nd, a 4th drowning death occurred when a man attempted a swim across Dolphin Lake at late-night, after park had closed.

In 1980, blue-collar workers at La Ronde's Alcan Aquarium enacted a 41 day strike, refusing to enter the aquarium to feed or care for its dolphins. Abandoned by their trainers, and left to starve in isolation, 3 dolphins died as a result of the neglect. Never recovering from the negativity surrounding the tragic event, the aquarium permanently closed in 1991.  

In 1992, the amusement park was used as a backdrop in the Are You Afraid of the Dark? episode "Laughing in the Dark" (season 1, episode 2) and was given the fictional name "Playland". The episode featured the park's giant roller coaster, haunted house with a dragon on the front and its old-fashioned carousel.

In 2001, the City of Montreal sold La Ronde to Six Flags, an American theme park chain, in a deal completed on May 4, 2001. It acquired all of the assets of the park for $20 million USD and has a long-term contract to lease the land from the city. Before the announcement of the Six Flags purchase, the city had considered offers from other bidders including Paramount Parks, Cedar Fair, and Parc Astérix. Since then, Six Flags has invested around $90 million in new rides and improvements, such as Le Vampire, Splash, Le Goliath and Ednör - L'Attaque as well as a new main entrance. 

In 2007, La Ronde celebrated its 40th anniversary with Expo 67 themed events commemorating the world fair.

In 2012, a man was struck and killed by "The Vampire" roller-coaster after entering a restricted zone while the ride was operating.

In 2020, after a three month delay due to the COVID-19 pandemic, La Ronde opened belatedly for its 54th operating season. It closed early for the season too due to the ongoing pandemic. Only a limited number of rides were open during its unprecedented two-month season that only ran from August 3 to October 3, 2020.

Attractions
La Ronde holds a number of attractions including live shows and amusement rides. As of 2020, the amusement park had 39 amusement rides including eight roller coasters. One of the park's roller coasters, Le Monstre, a  holds the record for highest double-tracked roller coaster in the world. During the month of October, the park hosts an annual Fright Fest to celebrate Halloween. The festival has four haunted houses, and many costumed performers who walk around the park. Park admission is free for toddlers under the age of two, accompanied by an adult.

Roller coasters

Flat and thrill rides

Children's rides

Six Flags changes

In May 2002, La Ronde announced the installation of a Bolliger & Mabillard inverted roller coaster called Le Vampire, which was the first major investment by Six Flags. It is a mirror image of the "Batman – The Ride" roller coasters found at many other Six Flags parks.

In 2003, La Ronde opened six new rides including Auto Tamponneuses, Tour de Ville, Manitou, Vertigo, Grand Carrousel, and Toboggan Nordique. Some existing rides were replaced by these new rides.

In 2004, La Ronde opened Le splash (a Shoot the Chute ride) and SpongeBob 3D.

For the 2007 season, La Ronde painted its observation tower bright orange to advertise Pizza Pizza, an Ontario pizza chain that was emerging into the Quebec market at the time. All of the pizza stands inside the park were renamed from Pizza Ronde to Pizza Pizza.

In January 2009, La Ronde announced its intention to become a Six Flags branded park, using the rights to Warner Bros. (Looney Tunes) and DC Comics trademarks under the licensing agreement with Six Flags. Le Vampire, a mirror image of Batman: The Ride constructed in 2002, carries no association to the Batman media franchise because the licence with Warner Bros. and DC Comics is not valid in unbranded Six Flags parks. It is not yet known whether Le Vampire will be re-branded to Batman: The Ride once the branding of the park commences.

La Ronde had a Nintendo-sponsored video game centre with the latest Nintendo video games and attractions. Since 2009, the former 3D theatre has housed Nintendo DS and Wii consoles, advertisements and a Nintendo Store.

The Serial Thriller, a Vekoma Suspended Looping Coaster that used to be located at the now defunct Six Flags AstroWorld, was shipped to La Ronde from the Great Escape, another Six Flags property where it had laid in storage since 2005. The roller coaster, which opened in 1999 at Six Flags AstroWorld, was installed over the Lac des Dauphins at the park for the 2010 season and is named Ednör - L'Attaque. It features special effects and is themed around an alleged sea monster that was purported to have appeared in the Lac des Dauphins.

On March 9, 2010, La Ronde announced that Terminator X: A Laser Battle for Salvation, an interactive laser-tag attraction themed around the Terminator series, would also be featured in the park for the 2010 season.

In 2013, the park opened a water-themed attraction, Aqua Twist. On August 29, 2013, Six Flags announced the addition of Demon, a top spin ride, for the 2014 season. As a world premiere, Goliath was the first roller coaster equipped and exploited with a virtual reality headset.

On August 28, 2014, Six Flags announced Maison Rouge, a haunted house, for the 2015 season.

On September 3, 2015, Six Flags announced Avenue Aventure, a section of the park which includes Bateau Pirate, Condor and two new rides: Phoenix, a Larson flying scooters, and Gravitor, a Chance Falling Star from Six Flags St. Louis.

On September 1, 2016 Six Flags announced Titan, a Zamperla Giant Discovery. It is the park's second pendulum ride. It is identical to the Riddler Revenge at Six Flags Over Texas.

In 2017, Le Monstre had only one track open for mainly the whole season while the other track was retracked. 

In May 2017, on its 50th anniversary, La Ronde announced the permanent closure of one of its original rides, La Pitoune. The water log ride dated back to the Expo 67, and had its final season in operation in 2016. It has since been dismantled.

On Saturday, May 19, 2018, Six Flags La Ronde opened a platform thrill ride called Le Tourbillon, a Larson International GX5 model (Waltzer-style) Tilt-A-Whirl, residing along L'Avenue across from the Phoenix. This addition was supposed to have been amongst the proposed featured rides for a new family section, called Carnaval En Folie (the newly-added ride was due to be named La Torsade).

On May 18, 2019, La Ronde debuted a new ride called Chaos, a Fire Ball ride by Larson International previously known as El Diablo when it was located at Six Flags Great Adventure from 2015 to 2018. After being relocated to La Ronde, its red color was changed to black, and it received new trains. Chaos is located on the former site of Le Moulin de la Sorcière between the rides Manitou and Boomerang. 

On August 25, 2019, Super Manège closed. In August 2019, Six Flags announced that Vipère, formerly Green Lantern: First Flight at Six Flags Magic Mountain, would debut in 2020. The project was delayed several times and ultimately cancelled in 2022.

In November 2022, La Ronde began the demolition and removal of the Minirail, another original ride dating back to Expo 67. It had been out of service since 2019, and was the last vestige of the monorail system that ran three separate circuits, with one on Norte-Dame Island and two on opposite ends of Saint Helen's Island.

Former attractions
A number of attractions and amusement rides have been installed and later removed from the park. They include:

See also
 Belmont Park, Montreal
 Dominion Park
 Incidents at Six Flags parks

Notes

References

External links

La Ronde official English website

Expo 67 – La Ronde

 
Six Flags amusement parks
Amusement parks in Canada
Expo 67
1967 establishments in Quebec
Tourist attractions in Montreal
Parc Jean-Drapeau
Companies that filed for Chapter 11 bankruptcy in 2009